Columbia, the fourth most populous city in Missouri, is home to six buildings of at least 100 feet. The tallest building in Columbia is Jesse Hall, which rises  over Francis Quadrangle on the University of Missouri campus. The second tallest building is Paquin Tower in Downtown Columbia at 172 feet. Also downtown, the Tiger Hotel, built in 1927, is located on the Avenue of the Columns.

History
Jesse Hall has been the tallest building in Columbia since its construction in 1894. Jesse Hall was constructed to replace the previous title holder, Academic Hall, which burned in 1892. The 5-story Guitar Building, built in 1910, is considered to be the city's "first skyscraper" and is contributing property to the Downtown Columbia Historic District.

Tallest buildings

Under construction and proposed
This lists buildings that are currently under construction or proposed in Columbia and are expected to rise to a height of at least eight stories.  For buildings whose heights have not yet been released by their developers, this table uses a floor count. A 24-story highrise was proposed  2013.

* Table entries with dashes (—) indicate that information regarding building heights or dates of completion has not yet been released.

See also
History of Columbia, Missouri
History of the University of Missouri

References

External links
Emprois

Columbia, Missouri
Tallest in Columbia
Tallest buildings